Ioannis (Yiannis) Dimitras (born 12 April 1954) is a Greek singer. He represented Greece in the Eurovision Song Contest in 1981, performing seventeenth on the night, before Cyprus and after Belgium, with the song "Feggari Kalokerino", and placed eighth out of twenty, with fifty-five points. He was a member of the Greek jury in 1996.

References

20th-century Greek male singers
Eurovision Song Contest entrants for Greece
Eurovision Song Contest entrants of 1981
Living people
1954 births
Musicians from Corfu